Concepción Fútbol Club is an Argentine football, club based in the city of Concepción, Tucumán. The team currently plays in the Torneo Argentino B, the regionalised 4th division of the Argentine football league system.

Titles
 Liga Tucumana del Sur (19)
 Liga Tucumana de Fútbol (4): 1988, 1992, 1994 y 1995

External links
Official website 
Concepción blog 

 
Association football clubs established in 1927
1927 establishments in Argentina